This is a list of lists of years by topic.

Arts, communication, and technology

 List of years in animation
 List of years in architecture
 List of years in art
 List of years in aviation
 List of years in comics
 List of years in film
 List of years in games
 List of years in literature
 List of years in music
 List of years in poetry
 List of years in radio
 List of years in television
 List of years in video games

Crime 
 List of years in organized crime
 List of years in piracy

Philosophy and science 

 List of years in anthropology
 List of years in archaeology
 List of years in magic
 List of years in philosophy
 List of years in science

Countries 
:Category:Years by country

Politics and international relations 
 Lists of sovereign states by year
 Lists of state leaders by year
 List of years in politics

Sports 
 List of years in American football
 List of years in association football
 List of years in baseball
 List of years in basketball
 List of years in figure skating
 List of years in gymnastics
 List of years in ice hockey
 List of years in ice sports
 List of years in professional wrestling

See also 
 List of years